SS Yale may refer to various American steamships, including:

See also
 

Ship names